Khazaliyeh (also Romanized as Khaz‘alīyeh; also known as Khaz‘alīā, Khaz-e Bālā, and Khaz-e-’Olya) is a village in Hoseyni Rural District, in the Central District of Shadegan County, Khuzestan Province, Iran. At the 2006 census, its population was 69, in 15 families.

References 

Populated places in Shadegan County